The Badaganadu are a Brahmin community that mainly reside in Karnataka and in Tamil Nadu.  They are followers of either the Advaita Vedanta propounded by Adi Shankara or the Dvaita Vedanta propounded by Madhvacharya and hence there are Smarthas and Madhwas among them.

See also
 Hoysala Karnataka Brahmins
 Forward Castes
 Madhwa Brahmins
 Smartha Brahmins

References

Kannada Brahmins